Hương Trà is a district-level town (thị xã) of Thua Thien-Huế province in the North Central Coast region of Vietnam. As of 2020 the town had a population of 72,677. The town covers an area of 392.32 km². The district capital lies at Tứ Hạ.

Hương Trà town is bordered by the city of Huế to the east, Phong Điền District to the west, Hương Thủy town and A Lưới District to the south and Quảng Điền District to the north. The area has both mountainous terrain and plains.

The town consists of the 5 phường (ward): Tứ Hạ, Hương Văn, Hương Xuân, Hương Vân, Hương Chữ and 4 xã (commune): Hương Toàn, Bình Thành, Bình Tiến, Hương Bình. Tứ Hạ is located on National Road 1A, the nation's main north-south artery, 16 km north of Huế.

References

Districts of Thừa Thiên Huế province
County-level towns in Vietnam